This is a list of the members of the Dewan Rakyat (House of Representatives) of the 15th Parliament of Malaysia.

Compositions

Outcomes of the 15th general election

Last election pendulum 
The 15th General Election witnessed 148 governmental seats and 74 non-governmental seats filled the Dewan Rakyat. The government side has 43 safe seats and 9 fairly safe seats, while the other side has 21 safe seats and 10 fairly safe seats.

Seating arrangement 
 The seating arrangement is viewable at the official website of the Parliament.

Elected members by state

Perlis

Kedah

Kelantan

Terengganu

Penang

Perak

Pahang

Selangor

Federal Territory of Kuala Lumpur

Federal Territory of Putrajaya

Negeri Sembilan

Malacca

Johor

Federal Territory of Labuan

Sabah

Sarawak

References 

15th Parliament of Malaysia
Lists of members of the Dewan Rakyat
Malaysia
Lists of current office-holders in Malaysia